Jordan James may refer to:

 Jordan James (rugby league) (born 1980), Welsh rugby league footballer
 Jordan James (soccer, born 1982), American soccer goalkeeper
 Jordan James (footballer, born 2004), Welsh football midfielder

See also
 James Jordan (disambiguation)